Tatsu Tanaka (14 August 1892 – 30 August 1985) was a Japanese midwife and politician. She was one of the first group of women elected to the House of Representatives in 1946.

Biography
Tanaka was born in Yonago in 1892. After finishing primary school, she began training as a nurse, graduating in 1911. She then attended Samba Gakko midwifery school, later studying at Kyoto Prefectural University of Medicine and qualifying as a public health nurse. She became chair of the Tottori Prefecture Nurses' Association and vice president of the Midwives' Association.

After World War II, Tanaka was an independent candidate in Tottori in the 1946 general elections (the first in which women could vote), and was elected to the House of Representatives. After being elected she joined the National Cooperative Party.  She unsuccessfully ran for re-election in 1947.

She died in 1985.

References

1892 births
Japanese midwives
Kyoto Prefectural University of Medicine alumni
20th-century Japanese women politicians
20th-century Japanese politicians
Members of the House of Representatives (Japan)
National Cooperative Party politicians
1985 deaths
People from Yonago, Tottori
Politicians from Tottori Prefecture